Fraser David Ingham Hornby (born 13 September 1999) is a professional footballer who plays as a striker for Belgian club Oostende on loan from Ligue 1 club Stade de Reims. Hornby, who was born in Northampton, has represented Scotland in youth international competitions.

Club career
Hornby joined Everton in September 2014, signing from Northampton Town for an initial fee of £65,500.
On 6 December 2017, Hornby was named in Everton's first team squad for the Europa League match away to Apollon Limassol. A day later, he made his first-team debut, starting and playing 82 minutes in a 3–0 win.

Hornby was loaned to Belgian club Kortrijk in August 2019. On 25 September 2019, he scored his first goal for the club in a 3–1 win over RFC Seraing in the Belgian Cup.

On 1 July 2020, Hornby joined Ligue 1 side Reims for an undisclosed fee.

On 1 February 2021, Hornby joined Aberdeen on loan for the rest of the season.

On 28 July 2022, Hornby was loaned to Oostende in Belgium, with an option to buy.

International career
Hornby has played for Scotland at the under-17, under-19 and under-21 levels. He scored a hat-trick for the under-21 team in a 3–0 win against Andorra on 6 September 2018, and then scored both goals in a 2–1 win against the Netherlands on 11 September. By scoring a hat-trick against San Marino on 13 October 2020, Hornby became the record goalscorer for the Scotland under-21 team (with 10).

Selected for the Scotland under-21 squad in the 2018 Toulon Tournament, the team lost to Turkey in a penalty-out and finished fourth.

Personal life
He is the younger brother of former Northampton Town midfielder Lewis Hornby.

Career statistics

Honours 
Everton U23s

 Premier League Cup: 2018–19

References

External links

1999 births
Living people
Footballers from Northampton
English footballers
Scottish footballers
Scotland youth international footballers
Scotland under-21 international footballers
Association football forwards
Northampton Town F.C. players
Everton F.C. players
K.V. Kortrijk players
Stade de Reims players
Aberdeen F.C. players
K.V. Oostende players
Belgian Pro League players
Ligue 1 players
Scottish Professional Football League players
English expatriate footballers
Scottish expatriate footballers
Expatriate footballers in Belgium
Expatriate footballers in France
English expatriate sportspeople in Belgium
English expatriate sportspeople in France
Scottish expatriate sportspeople in Belgium
Scottish expatriate sportspeople in France
English people of Scottish descent
Championnat National 2 players